Olanrewaju Ajibola (born 1975) is a Nigerian chess player.

Chess career
He represented Nigeria in the 39th Chess Olympiad, scoring 4/9 on board 2.

In March 2020, he won the Zone 4.2 Individual Open Chess Championship, winning the blitz and rapid sections as well as the classical.

He qualified for the Chess World Cup 2021 where he was defeated 2-0 by Alexey Sarana in the first round.

Personal life
He graduated from the Federal University of Technology, Akure.

References

External links
 
 
 Olanrewaju Ajibola games at 365Chess.com

1975 births
Living people
Nigerian chess players
Chess Olympiad competitors